Tiffany Géroudet (born 3 September 1986 in Sion, Valais) is a Swiss épée fencer, European champion in 2011. She is currently 9th in FIE rankings.

Biography 

Géroudet was born in Sion, Switzerland, in a family of three children. She practiced ski, swimming, and mountain hiking with her siblings before taking on fencing with her brother.

She won her first major medal with a gold at the 2006 Junior World Championships in Taebaek City. On the same year, she won her first national championship, which she went on winning seven times in a row. She was a member of the Switzerland women's épée team that earned a bronze medal in the 2009 European Championships in Plovdiv.

In 2011, she won the European Championships in Sheffield, beating along the way favourites Laura Flessel, Nathalie Moellhausen, and Britta Heidemann. She became the first and as to 2013 only Swiss female European fencing champion. She qualified for the 2012 Summer Olympics in London, but was beaten in the table of 16 by Sun Yujie, who later took the bronze medal.

In the 2013–14 season she won her first World Cup gold medal in Doha.

References

External links 
 Tiffany Géroudet site
 Eurofencing bio

1986 births
Living people
Fencers at the 2012 Summer Olympics
Fencers at the 2016 Summer Olympics
Olympic fencers of Switzerland
Swiss female épée fencers
People from Sion, Switzerland
Sportspeople from Valais